Nagasu may refer to:

Nagasu, Kumamoto
Mirai Nagasu, American figure skater

Japanese-language surnames